The 2017–18 Total League season, is the 65th season of the first division of the professional basketball in Luxembourg.

Amicale defended successfully its title and achieved their eighth league.

Competition format
The regular season consisted in a double-legged round robin tournament where the six first qualified teams advanced to the group for the title, while the other four teams played for avoiding relegation.

In the second stage, all wins from the regular season count for the standings, while the points are reset. The four first qualified teams in the group for the title, advanced to the playoffs, played in a format of best-of-three-games series.

Teams of the relegation group play twice against themselves and twice against the four first qualified teams of the first stage of the Nationale 2. The two worst teams would be relegated.

Teams

Regular season

Second stage

Group for the title

Relegation group

Playoffs

Bracket
Seeded teams played games 1, 3 and 5 at home.

Quarterfinals

|}

Semifinals

|}

Finals

|}

References

External links
Luxembourgish basketball at Eurobasket.com
Total League website at FLBB.com

Luxembourg
Basketball in Luxembourg